Molvanîa (subtitled A Land Untouched by Modern Dentistry) is a book parodying travel guidebooks. The guide describes the fictional country Molvanîa, a post-Soviet state, a nation described as "the birthplace of the whooping cough" and "owner of Europe's oldest nuclear reactor".  It was created by Australians Tom Gleisner, Santo Cilauro and Rob Sitch (locally known for The D-Generation and The Panel in Australia). Along with the other Jetlag Travel volumes, 2004's Phaic Tăn and 2006's San Sombrèro, the book parodies both the language of heritage tourism and the legacy of colonialism and imperialism. The book has been criticized for promoting racial stereotypes.

History 
The book became a surprise success after its initial publication in Australia, sparking a bidding war for the international publication rights. Qantas has even run the half-hour video segment produced in association with the book on its international flights.

About Molvanîa 
The Republic of Molvanîa is a composite of many of the worst stereotypes and clichés about former Eastern Bloc and post-Soviet states.  The exact location of Molvanîa is never specified; it is said to border around Hungary, Slovakia, and Slovenia. The shape of the country with its divisions strongly suggests Moldova, and the name has similarities (as has the location description by the authors as "somewhere between Romania and downwind from Chernobyl"); it can also represent a composite country consisting of parts of the Czech Republic, Hungary, Poland, Slovakia, Ukraine, Croatia, and Serbia). The book mentions Bulgarians, Hungarians, and perhaps Moldovans (ethnic Romanians) as its inhabitants: "The Molvanian population is made up of three major ethnic groups: the Bulgs (68%) who live predominantly in the centre and south, the Hungars (29%) who inhabit the northern cities, and the Molvs (3%) who can be found mainly in prison."

The book describes the nation as having been a desolate barren-like wasteland for much of its history, similar to Russia since the 12th century, torn by civil war and ethnic unrest. Eventually Molvanîa's various warring factions were united as a single kingdom, ruled by a series of cruel despotic kings. In the late 19th century the monarchy was overthrown, but the royal family remained popular in exile. During World War II the country was allied with Nazi Germany, and then afterwards was occupied by the Soviet Union, who set up a Communist puppet government. After the fall of European Communism in the 1990s, the country became a dictatorship run by a corrupt government with heavy ties to the Mafia.

Molvanîa is described as a very poor and rural country, heavily polluted and geographically barren. The infrastructure is terrible, with necessities such as electricity, clean water, and indoor plumbing being rare finds, largely due to bureaucratic incompetence. Though the travel guide tries to suggest otherwise, there is little to do in the country, the hotels are tiny, filthy and dilapidated, the ethnic cuisine disgusting, and the "tourist attractions" boring and overpriced.

The Molvanîan people are portrayed as being generally rude, dirty, and at times slightly psychotic, with numerous bizarre and illogical beliefs and traditions. The country's patron saint is Fyodor.

Language 
The fictional Molvanîan language is said to be so complicated that it takes an average of 16 years to learn. Not only is the tone in which one speaks important to the meaning, but also the pitch. It is a gendered language, with different articles being used depending on whether a noun is masculine, feminine, neutral, or a type of cheese. There are language schools for tourists to attend, which are described by the book as a "waste of time".

Flag 
The flag of Molvanîa is called the "Trikolor" despite the fact it only contains two colours: red and yellow. During the Soviet occupation, the flag had a yellow hammer and sickle in the top left corner. After the fall of communism, Molvanîa became one of the few ex-Soviet states to retain the hammer and sickle, but added a trowel into the symbol.

Anthem 
The country's national anthem could be heard on the website Molvania.com (via Wayback Machine), which sounded more like a funeral march than a patriotic tune. Its lyrics are largely anti-gypsy, yet when anyone leaves the country, the border security gives citizens and tourists the gypsy curse, and it rubs in the fact that the country is a failed state.

Criticism 
The book was criticized by the United Kingdom's former Minister for Europe Keith Vaz, who accused it of exploiting prejudice. Vaz said the book was a little "cheeky" because "it does reflect some of the prejudices which are taking root [in Europe]. He [Mr Gleisner] does try and show exactly where we are lacking in our knowledge, the sad thing is, some people might actually believe that this country exists."

Fictional travel guides 
This book advertises other (fictional) travel guides on San Sombrèro (South America), Takki Tikki (French Polynesia), Bongoswana (Central Africa), the Tofu Islands (South East Asia), Moustachistan (Central Asia) and a guide on sailing the Syphollos Straits (Mediterranean Sea), populated by young, sexually-liberated travelers. The book encouraged other travelers of Molvanîa to share their stories of towns with drinkable water on its website, however, it notes that reports of unusual troop movements or mass graves should be addressed to the United Nations instead.

Sequels 
Subsequent travel guide parodies published examine Southeast Asian nation Phaic Tăn (published in 2004) and San Sombrèro in Latin America (published in 2006).

See also 

 Elbonia
 Lower Slobbovia
 Ruritania
 Zladko Vladcik
 Syldavia

References

External links 
Official Site for Molvanîa
"MOLVANIA Elektronik Supersonik" (disqualified Eurovision Song Contest entry, 2006). YouTube.

Fictional European countries
2003 non-fiction books
Australian books
Travel guide books
Australian travel books
Comedy books
Eastern Europe in fiction